Norris C. Babiera was a Filipino politician. He was Vice-Governor of Misamis Oriental. Before he became the vice-governor, he was acting governor of the said province from December 1987 to February 1988.

In the May 2013 midterm election, he ran for governor of Misamis Oriental under the banner of the Liberal Party, but lost.

References

Governors of Misamis Oriental
People from Misamis Oriental
Year of birth missing (living people)
Living people